Louis S. Arkoff is an American film producer; he is the son of executive producer Samuel Z. Arkoff.

Arkoff studied cinema at University of Souther California and law at Loyola University. In 1973 he joined AIP as a legal administrator. He worked his way up to be an executive and vice president of the company.

Among his credits are several made-for-cable movies which were remakes of his father's films in the early 1990s.

Select credits

Film work

Television work

References

External links

Lou Arkoff filmography at New York Times

American film producers
Living people
Year of birth missing (living people)